Karimabad-e Robat (also Romanized as Karīmābād-e Robāṭ; also known as Karīmābād) is a village in Baghin Rural District, in the Central District of Kerman County, Kerman Province, Iran. At the 2006 census, its population was 73, in 14 families.

References 

Populated places in Kerman County